Leo C. "Jack" Kiefer (January 1, 1940 – September 24, 1999) was an American professional golfer who won two Senior PGA Tour events in the 1990s.

Kiefer was born in Columbia, Pennsylvania. He attended Millersville State College and turned professional in 1967. Kiefer spent his regular career years working as a club and teaching pro. He played in a small number of PGA Tour events. His best finish in a major championship — the only major he played —  was a T-60 at the 1976 PGA Championship.

Kiefer joined the Senior PGA Tour (now known as the Champions Tour) in 1990. Through Monday qualifying and sponsor's exemptions, Kiefer played in enough events in 1992 to finish 32nd on the money list earning him a full-time spot on the Tour in 1993. He had 45 top-10 finishes in Senior PGA Tour events including victories at Ralphs Senior Classic in 1994 and du Maurier Champions in 1997. Kiefer owns the Champions Tour record for consecutive holes at par or better (97).

Kiefer was inducted into the New Jersey PGA Hall of Fame in 1997. He died of cancer at the age of 59 in Stuart, Florida.

Professional wins (6)

Regular career wins (4)
this list may be incomplete
1971 Pennsylvania Open Championship
1975 New Jersey State Open
1976 New Jersey State Open
1983 New Jersey State Open

Senior PGA Tour wins (2)

References

External links

American male golfers
PGA Tour Champions golfers
Golfers from Pennsylvania
People from Columbia, Pennsylvania
People from Stuart, Florida
Neurological disease deaths in Florida
Deaths from cancer in Florida
Deaths from spinal cancer
1940 births
1999 deaths